Nils Grönvall (15 May 1894 – 13 July 1983) was a Swedish fencer. He competed in the individual foil event at the 1912 Summer Olympics.

References

External links
 

1894 births
1983 deaths
Swedish male foil fencers
Olympic fencers of Sweden
Fencers at the 1912 Summer Olympics
Sportspeople from Lund